Allen Gilbert Cram (1886–1947) was an American painter.  Born in Washington D.C. on February 1, 1886, Cram received his fine art education in the East, studying under William Merritt Chase.

Cram later moved to San Diego, working mostly with western scenes. He was also an etcher and an illustrator for the U.S. Government. Three of his large-scale paintings hang in the Santa Barbara County Courthouse.

External links
 
Allen Gilbert Cram, at AskArt.Com
Historic Santa Barbara Courthouse, paintings by Allan Gilbert Cram

1886 births
1947 deaths